Marco Zaffaroni (born 20 January 1969) is an Italian football manager and former player, who played predominantly as a defender. He is currently the head coach of  club Hellas Verona.

Coaching career
On 24 June 2019, he was appointed head coach of Serie C club AlbinoLeffe.

Following the club's positive campaign in the 2020–21 Serie C playoffs, Zaffaroni was subsequently hired as Chievo's head coach for the 2021–22 Serie B season. However, after the club's exclusion from professional football, he left for Cosenza, the club that was admitted to fill Chievo's vacancy in the Italian second division. He was fired by Cosenza on 6 December 2021 after the club gained 1 point in 6 games and dropped to 16th place.

On 3 December 2022, Zaffaroni was hired as the new head coach of Serie A relegation-battling club Verona, with outgoing caretaker Salvatore Bocchetti as his assistant.

Managerial statistics

Honours

Manager 
 Monza
Serie D: 2016-17
Scudetto Dilettanti: 2016-17

References

1969 births
Living people
Italian footballers
A.C. Monza players
Footballers from Milan
Association football defenders
Italian football managers
U.C. AlbinoLeffe managers
A.C. Monza managers
A.C. ChievoVerona managers
Cosenza Calcio managers
Serie D managers
Serie C managers
Serie B managers
S.C. Caronnese S.S.D. players
Hellas Verona F.C. managers
Serie A managers